The Turvo River is a river of Rio Grande do Sul state in southern Brazil. It is a tributary of the Uruguay River.

The Turvo River defines the western boundary of the  Turvo State Park, created in 1947.

See also
List of rivers of Rio Grande do Sul

References

Rivers of Rio Grande do Sul